Ogden Reservoir may refer to:

Ogden Reservoir (Greater Manchester), near Rochdale
Ogden Reservoirs, near Barley, Lancashire
Ogden Reservoir in Haslingden Grane
Ogden Water, near Halifax, West Yorkshire